Guillermo Díaz (born 29 September 1964) is a Mexican wrestler. He competed at the 1992 Summer Olympics and the 1996 Summer Olympics.

References

1964 births
Living people
Mexican male sport wrestlers
Olympic wrestlers of Mexico
Wrestlers at the 1992 Summer Olympics
Wrestlers at the 1996 Summer Olympics
Place of birth missing (living people)
Pan American Games medalists in wrestling
Pan American Games bronze medalists for Mexico
Wrestlers at the 1983 Pan American Games
20th-century Mexican people
21st-century Mexican people